Holcoglossum (Holc.) is a genus of orchids, in the family Orchidaceae. It is native to China and Southeast Asia.

Description
All species of this genus are perennial epi- or lithophytes and are characterized by a short monopodial shoot axis with terete or cross-sectionally triangular leaves. The upper side forms a groove with the folded edges of the leaves. The leaves are tapered and not notched at the leaf tip. The root tips of living roots show a reddish color in all species of the genus, and some species also have red-spotted foliage. The flowering stem emerges laterally from the shoot axis and forms two or more flowers, which are far apart and form a raceme or inflorescence.

The flowers are white and wide open. The lip is three-lobed. The lateral lobes are erect and dotted adaxially. The central part is spread out over a large area and is parallel to the gynostemium. The lip is shaped to allow potential pollinators to depress the middle lip. The flowers have an elongated spur, which is strongly reduced in the subgenus Brachycentron. The gynostemium has a large scar area. The stamen contains two separate pollina. The stipes connecting the pollina and the adhesive disc (Viscidium) bend in the middle when removed from the rostellum. The rostellum is deeply incised. The number of chromosomes is 2n = 38 in almost all species. Holcoglossum tsii has 76 chromosomes in the diploid chromosome set (2n = 76).

Self-pollination has been observed in Holcoglossum amesianum, in which the pollina moves independently to the fertile stigma in the column.

Distribution
The distribution area of the genus extends over southwest China, Laos, Vietnam, Thailand and Malaysia. However, most of the species come from the Yunnan province in the south-west of the People's Republic of China. Holcoglossum quasipinifolium and Holcoglossum pumilum are endemic to Taiwan. The species live at higher altitudes between 1200 m and 3300 m and thus prefer a cool to cold habitat.

Species
Holcoglossum amesianum (Rchb.f.) Christenson - Yunnan, Assam, Myanmar, Vietnam, Thailand, Laos, Cambodia 
Holcoglossum auriculatum Z.J.Liu, S.C.Chen & X.H.Jin - Yunnan, Myanmar, Vietnam, Thailand
Holcoglossum calcicola Schuit. & P.Bonnet - Laos
Holcoglossum flavescens (Schltr.) Z.H.Tsi - Fujian, Hubei, Sichuan, Yunnan
Holcoglossum kimballianum (Rchb.f.) Garay - Yunnan, Myanmar, Vietnam, Thailand, Laos
Holcoglossum linearifolium Z.J.Liu, S.C.Chen & L.J.Chen - Yunnan
Holcoglossum lingulatum (Aver.) Aver. - Guangxi, Yunnan, Vietnam
Holcoglossum nujiangense X.H.Jin & S.C.Chen - Yunnan
Holcoglossum omeiense X.H.Jin & S.C.Chen - Sichuan
Holcoglossum quasipinifolium (Hayata) Schltr. - Taiwan
Holcoglossum rupestre (Hand.-Mazz.) Garay - Yunnan
Holcoglossum sinicum Christenson - Yunnan
Holcoglossum subulifolium (Rchb.f.) Christenson - Hainan, Yunnan
Holcoglossum wangii Christenson - Yunnan, Guangxi, Vietnam
Holcoglossum weixiense X.H.Jin & S.C.Chen - Yunnan

Culture
The small species from this genus can be cultivated in small pots or baskets or tied to cork plates. Native of cool, damp woods, they require low temperatures and a light spot. In full sun, however, there is a risk of heat build-up. The plants often need water during the growth phase, and less frequent watering during the resting phase without letting them dry out. For a pot culture, the substrate should be quite fine in order to be able to nourish the tender roots.

The large species of the subgenus Brachycentron and section Holcoglossum can be cultivated in a tether but are best suited to basket or pot culture. An exception is Holcoglossum subulifolium, which is better tied up due to its hanging growth. If regular watering is ensured, these species are best cultivated in a basket without substrate. Any substrate used should be very coarse in texture to allow good air circulation at the roots. The plants need a very bright but also cool location. They should be watered regularly, with drier periods during dormancy.
In the Meise Botanic Garden, Holcoglossum kimballianum are kept in an alpine greenhouse, where you have to condense your own breath and wear a parka. In nature, the plants are regularly exposed to hoarfrost during the flowering period, which they survive without any problems.

A successful culture often fails because the culture is permanently too warm or because the substrate is too fine, in which the roots die off due to the lack of air.

Intergeneric Hybrids
The following intergeneric hybrids with Holcoglossum are listed with the Royal Horticultural Society.
 ×Holcocentrum (Holcoglossum ×  Ascocentrum)
 ×Holcenda (Holcoglossum ×  Ascocentrum ×  Vanda)
 ×Holcosia (Holcoglossum × Luisia)
 ×Holcanthera (Holcoglossum × Renanthera)
 ×Holcodirea (Holcoglossum × Sedirea)
 ×Holcopsis (Holcoglossum × Vandopsis)
 ×Holcostylis (Holcoglossum × Rhynchostylis)
 ×Holcovanstylis (Holcoglossum × Rhynchostylis × Vanda)
 ×Mendelara (Holcoglossum ×  Ascocentrum × Neofinetia × Rhynchostylis × Vanda)
 ×Vandoglossum (Holcoglossum × Vanda)

References

External links 
 
 
  Pervy orchids Sequenced photos of self-pollinating Holcoglossum

 
Vandeae genera
Orchids of Asia